Harlem Blues is a song written by W. C. Handy

It may also refer to:
Harlem Blues (Donald Byrd album), a 1988 album featuring the above composition
Harlem Blues (Phineas Newborn Jr. album), an album by  pianist Phineas Newborn Jr. recorded in 1969 and released in 1975